The Kampar railway station is a Malaysia train station located and named after the town of Kampar, Perak.

The Kampar KTM Railway Station is situated at the south-eastern part of town, in the vicinity of a housing estate known as Taman Melayu Jaya. This new and modern station was officiated in 2007. The Transport Ministry has built two lifts at the railway station here to make it easier for the disabled to take the train. The lifts are located near the overhead bridge for the passengers to cross easily to the opposite platform and vice versa. At one end of the station, there is a freight yard. It was made prior to the Rawang-Ipoh Electrified Double Tracking Project.

Location and locality 
The station is located on the southwest area of the old town of Kampar, Perak in the Taman Melayu Jaya residential area. It is accessible via direct road from the old town of Kampar or via junction to Taman Melayu Jaya from Federal Route 1.

The station serve mainly the town of Kampar, Perak which also includes the campus of Universiti Tunku Abdul Rahman and the surrounding New Town development. Attractions like Gua Tempurung and Bandar Agacia also just located on a reasonable distance from this station. Other nearest town served also includes Mambang Diawan, Jeram, Kuala Dipang and Malim Nawar.

History 
The original station opens in 1895 as part of Perak Railways. The original purpose is to transport the tin deposits from nearby mines to Telok Anson Wharf southwest, and is part of the opening sector of Ipoh - Telok Anson Wharf. It is situated at Jalan Degong, where the current Federal Route 70 between Kampar and Teluk Intan lies today.

It is later incorporated as part of Federated Malay States Railway (FMSR), allowing it to be connected as far as the network grows to other main states of Malaya back then. In 1923, it is now connected up to the Siam border and down to Singapore, being part of the main West Coast line. As a thriving tin mine town, passenger and goods services do stop at this station.

However it also experiences grim situations as it was located in the heat of the conflict during Malayan Emergency starting in 1948. Services is always disrupted by frequent derailments by Malayan Communist Party forces along the railway line nearby. The station building itself has been burned in an attack by MCP forces in 1952. A temporary building has been built to replace the station which is smaller in size at the same site.

The original site is later taken over by Societé Anonyme des étains de Kinta (S.E.K.), a France mining company for their tin mining activity expansion. As a follow up, they build a new, proper station 1.5 kilometres from the original station, and the track also has been relocated to direct to the newly-build station. As of 1965, the new building is now in operation replacing the smaller temporary station that has been operating for 12 years.

The new station later continues to serve rail services of FMSR, later KTMB after independence. However the station itself has been affected by downfall of passengers caused by tin mines closure in the 80s with the town itself faces decline for some time. The setting up of Universiti Tunku Abdul Rahman campus here later on rejuvenates the purpose of this town, with the station itself also saw an increase of passengers as a result.

The current station building was later built in 2007 besides the old station, replacing it as part of the Rawang-Ipoh Electrification and Double Tracking Project with better facilities and structures to serve electrified railway services. around. With the opening of the current station building, the old station building has since been abandoned of use despite still retained beside the new building.

With the new Electric Train Service commences in 2010, Kampar station is made part of its pilot service, serving Ipoh to KL Sentral sector with extensions up to Seremban. It still serves Intercity services up to 2016, when the Intercity services is discontinued on whole electrified sectors of KTMB lines.

Today it serves mainly the passenger services of ETS Ipoh-KL sector, as well as further sector of Gemas-KL Sentral-Padang Besar and KL Sentral-Butterworth.

Station features 
The station design follows the standard 2007 KTM station designs which made it very similar to other station designs across the Rawang-Ipoh electrified sector. The station is mainly single-floored.

The general layout mainly consisted of 2 side platforms, with Platform 1 is for northward trains to Ipoh, Butterworth and Padang Besar while Platform 2 is usually for southward trains to KL Sentral and Gemas. Pedestrian bridge connects the two platforms with elevator and stair access available.

The only station public access however is only on Platform 2 side where the station lobby and other public facilities is located. As such, passengers are forced to enter the station only from the P2 side, and those who wishes to take the train north need to use the pedestrian bridge to go across the tracks to Platform 1 on the other side. Platform access is restricted to alighting passengers with valid tickets only.

On the station lobby, there's a ticketing office, station offices, toilets on both platform and entrance sides, and also the praying room for Muslims. There's also a station canteen which supposed to sell foods and beverages, but the canteen had never been in operation on the current years. A vending machines is available here which sells drinks of various brands.

There's access for disabled person with a wheelchair ramp and bridge elevator access for those with walking disabilities and impairments as well as tile assistant for blind people in both lobby and platforms.

In 2021 an automated control gate is installed at the platform gate with passengers now required to scan QR code on their tickets (either digital or physical) to be able to enter the platform area. Before this the platform access is controlled manually by ticket checks by station staffs.

References

External links

 Kampar Railway Station

Kampar District
KTM ETS railway stations
Railway stations in Perak
Railway stations opened in 1895
Railway stations opened in 2007